The Abbasid caliphs were the holders of the Islamic title of caliph who were members of the Abbasid dynasty, a branch of the Quraysh tribe descended from the uncle of the Islamic prophet Muhammad, Al-Abbas ibn Abd al-Muttalib. 

The family came to power in the Abbasid Revolution in 748–750, supplanting the Umayyad Caliphate. They were the rulers of the Abbasid Caliphate, as well as the generally recognized ecumenical heads of Islam, until the 10th century, when the Shi'a Fatimid Caliphate (established in 909) and the Caliphate of Córdoba (established in 929) challenged their primacy. The political decline of the Abbasids had begun earlier, during the Anarchy at Samarra (861–870), which accelerated the fragmentation of the Muslim world into autonomous dynasties. The caliphs lost their temporal power in 936–946, first to a series of military strongmen, and then to the Shi'a Buyid Emirs that seized control of Baghdad; the Buyids were in turn replaced by the Sunni Seljuk Turks in the mid-11th century, and Turkish rulers assumed the title of "Sultan" to denote their temporal authority. The Abbasid caliphs remained the generally recognized suzerains of Sunni Islam, however. In the mid-12th century, the Abbasids regained their independence from the Seljuks, but the revival of Abbasid power ended with the Sack of Baghdad by the Mongols in 1258. 

Most Abbasid caliphs were born to a concubine mother, known as umm al-walad. The term refers to a slave woman who had a child from her owner; those women were renowned for their beauty and intelligence, in that the owner might recognize the legitimacy of his children from them to be legally free and with full rights of inheritance, and refrain from trading the mothers afterwards. Those concubines mostly were Abyssinians, Armenians, Berbers, Byzantine Greeks, Turkish or even from Sicily.

Abbasid Caliphs (25 January 750 – 20 February 1258)

Caliphs of Cairo (13 June 1261 – 22 January 1517)

In 1261, the Abbasid dynasty was re-established by a cadet branch of the dynasty at Cairo, under the auspices of the local Mamluk sultans but these caliphs were purely religious and symbolic figures, while temporal power rested with the Mamluks. The revived caliphate in Cairo lasted until the Ottoman conquest of Egypt in 1517, after which the caliphal title passed to the Ottoman dynasty.

The Cairo Abbasids were largely ceremonial caliphs under the patronage of the Mamluk Sultanate that existed after the takeover of the Ayyubid dynasty.

Genealogy

References

Bibliography
 
 
 
 
 
 
 

 
 
 
 
 
 Bennison, Amira K. (2009) The Great Caliphs: The Golden Age of the 'Abbasid Empire. Princeton: Yale University Press, p. 47. ISBN 0300167989

 
Abbasid Caliphs
Abbasid Caliphs
8th-century rulers in Asia
8th-century rulers in Europe
8th-century rulers in Africa
9th-century rulers in Asia
9th-century rulers in Africa
9th-century rulers in Europe
10th-century rulers in Africa
10th-century rulers in Asia
11th-century rulers in Asia
12th-century rulers in Asia
13th-century rulers in Asia
Medieval Islamic world-related lists